Fear a' Bhàta (translated The boatman) is a Scots Gaelic song from the late 18th century, written by Sìne NicFhionnlaigh (Jean Finlayson) of Tong who was courting a young fisherman from Uig, Dòmhnall MacRath. The song captures the emotions that she endured during their courtship. The part of the story that is rarely told is that they were married not long after she composed the song.

Lyrics
There are many versions of the lyrics and of the melody:

See also
 Ailein duinn
 Chì mi na mòrbheanna
 Gaelic music

References

External links
 Lyrics for full traditional version
 Lyrics for all versions
 Sìneag MacIntyre's rendition on the BBC website for learners of Gaelic 

Scottish songs
18th-century songs
18th century in Scotland
Scottish Gaelic language
Year of song unknown
Scottish Gaelic poems